The 1999 Sydney International was a tennis tournament played on outdoor hard courts at the NSW Tennis Centre in Sydney in Australia that was part of the International Series of the 1999 ATP Tour and of Tier II of the 1999 WTA Tour. The tournament was held from 11 through 16 January 1999.

Seeds
Champion seeds are indicated in bold text while text in italics indicates the round in which those seeds were eliminated.

Draw

Finals

References

 
syd